Dolgo Brdo is a small settlement in the Municipality of Litija in central Slovenia. The area is part of the traditional region of Lower Carniola. It is now included with the rest of the municipality in the Central Sava Statistical Region; until January 2014 the municipality was part of the Central Slovenia Statistical Region.

References

External links
Dolgo Brdo on Geopedia

Populated places in the Municipality of Litija